Bahsuma or Behsuma is a town and a nagar panchayat in Meerut district  in the state of Uttar Pradesh, India. It is an ancient town of Mahabharata.
It is basically known for being the birthplace of Bhism Pitamah.

Bahsuma is located near the famous Mahabharata Place , which is just 5 kms away

Geography
It has an average elevation of 223 metres (731 feet).

History
In the days of Mahabharta (A great epic of Hindu), its name was Bhishma Puri.  It was the place of Great Bhishma Pitamah (the Son of Ganga). According to the tradition, Bahsuma was a muhalla of Hastinapur (which is about 5 km south-east of the village) and served as the treasury of the Kauravas and Pandavas, the place deriving its name from 'vasu' which means treasure. In the times of Gurjar Raja Nain Singh of Parikshitgarh, it became the headquarters of the government. The house of the Raja Nain Singh and a fort built by him still stand in the village.

Demographics
 India census, Bahsuma had a population of 10,561. Males constitute 53% of the population and females 47%. Bahsuma has an average literacy rate of 58%, lower than the national average of 59.5%; with 60% of the males and 40% of females literate. 17% of the population is under 6 years of age.

References

External links

Cities and towns in Meerut district